Jorge Luís Pérez Alvarado is a Dominican diplomat and is the first, and current, Ambassador of the Dominican Republic to Russia, presenting his credentials to Russian President Vladimir Putin on 18 January 2007.

References

Living people
Ambassadors of the Dominican Republic to Russia
Year of birth missing (living people)